Helene (Hel) Braun (June 3, 1914 – May 15, 1986) was a German mathematician who specialized in number theory and modular forms. Her autobiography, The Beginning of A Scientific Career, described her experience as a female scientist working in a male-dominated field at the time, in the Third Reich.

She is known for proving the convergence of the Eisenstein series.

Scientific career 
Braun studied mathematics at the University of Marburg from 1933 to 1937. In 1937 she worked with Carl Ludwig Siegel in Frankfurt to study the decomposition of quadratic forms into sums of squares. Her dissertation, Über die Zerlegung quadratischer Formen in Quadrate, was also supervised by Georg Aumann. After completing that work, he took her on as a scientific assistant before she became a professor in her own right teaching the theory of Hermitian forms in 1940.

She became a lecturer at the University of Göttingen in 1941, becoming a full professor in 1947. From 1947 through 1948, she was a member of the Institute for Advanced Study.

In 1951, Braun moved and became a professor at the University of Hamburg where she met and worked with Emil Artin and other internationally acclaimed mathematicians of the time.

Personal life
Braun never married, but in the 1960s while she was a professor at the University of Hamburg, she shared an apartment with Emil Artin, and their relationship was equivalent to marriage according to everyone who knew them.

After she retired in 1981, she lived out the rest of her life in Hamburg.

Selected publications 
A list of the publications by Hel Braun was published by Helmut Strade in the Communications of the Mathematical Society in Hamburg, Volume XI, Issue 4, 1987.
She wrote two books:

.

References

External links
Photos of Hel Braun in the Oberwolfach Photo Collection

1914 births
1986 deaths
20th-century German mathematicians
Women mathematicians
University of Marburg alumni
Academic staff of the University of Göttingen
Academic staff of the University of Hamburg